Ambalaomby is a rural municipality in Anosibe An'ala District, Alaotra-Mangoro Region, Madagascar.

Protected areas
The Protected area of Tsinjoarivo-Ambalaomby (or foret de Tsinjoarivo-Ambalaomby).

Rivers
The Onive River is present in this area.

References

Populated places in Alaotra-Mangoro